Invocation is an album by composer William Lloyd Webber.

Track listing
 Aurora
 Serenade for Strings
 Invocation
 Lento for Strings in E major
 Three Spring Miniatures
 Nocturne for Cello and Harp, Julian Lloyd Webber (Cello), Skaila Kanga (Harp)
 Love Divine, All Loves Excelling, Westminster Singers
 Benedictus for Violin and Organ, Tasmin Little (Violin), Ian Watson (Organ)
 Mass "Princeps pacis", Westminster Singers
 Jesus, Dear Jesus, conducted by Gareth Jones, Hollie Cook (Soprano), John Antrobus (Organ) and London Arts Educational School Choir.

Tracks 1,2,3,4,5,7,9 were conducted by Richard Hickox with the City of London Sinfonia.

References

External links
Listing at Chandos Records

1998 classical albums